This is a list of the largest cities and towns in Belarus, including settlements with a population of over 5,000, as recorded by the National Statistical Committee of the Republic of Belarus. Neither the Belarusian nor Russian languages have equivalent words to "city" and "town" in English. The word horad or gorod is used for both.

Overview
The Belarusian legislature uses a three-level hierarchy of town classifications.

According to the Law under May 5, 1998, the categories of the most developed urban localities in Belarus are as follows:
 capital — Minsk;
 city of oblast (voblasć) subordinance — urban locality with the population of not less than 50,000 people; it has its own body of self-government, known as Council of Deputies and an executive committee, which stand on the level with these of a raion.
 city of raion subordinance — urban locality with the population of more than 6,000 people; it may have its own body of self-government and an executive committee, which belong to the same level as these of rural councils and of s.c. haradski pasiolak (a type of a smaller urban locality).

This division was inherited by the contemporary Republic of Belarus from BSSR and introduced in 1938.

As of 2020, 115 settlements had the status of a city/town. Among them:
 10 cities of oblast (voblasć) subordinance;
 104 towns of raion subordinance;
 Minsk — the capital of the country.

The list

Map 
Map legend:

  Capital
  Cities and towns of regional (voblast) subordination
  Cities and towns of raion subordination

Gallery

See also
 Instruction on transliteration of Belarusian geographical names with letters of Latin script
 Names of Belarusian places in other languages
 List of renamed cities in Belarus

References

External links
 Toponym.by — toponyms map of Belarus. Search by pattern and the visualization on the map.
 Current Status of United Nations Romanization Systems for Geographical Names of Belarus
 

 
 

Belarus
Belarus